Copa Libertadores 1973 was won by defending champions Independiente of Argentina after defeating Colo Colo of Chile in a third decisive game. The third match which ended 2–1 in extra time was necessary after the previous two leg matches ended in draws.

Group stage

Group 1

Group 2

Group 3

Group 4
The Venezuelan club teams Deportivo Italia and Deportivo Galicia did not participate in the Copa Libertadores due to internal problems with the Venezuelan footballing federation.

Group 5

Semi-finals
The five previous group leaders formed two new groups of three which included the 1972 Copa Libertadores defending champion Independiente.

Group A

Group B

Finals

Champion

1
Copa Libertadores seasons